Mahinder Yadav (born 5 May 1963), also spelled as Mahendra Yadav, is an Indian politician from the Aam Aadmi Party (AAP). He is currently a member of the Sixth Legislative Assembly of Delhi (MLA). He has represented Vikaspuri assembly constituency as MLA since December 2014.

Personal life
Mahender Yadav was born on 5 May 1963 in New Delhi. His father's name is Mewa Ram Yadav. Mahinder Yadav has passed 10th standard (matriculate) from the CBSE board in 1980.  He is a social worker. He is a businessman and a retail trader and supplier of building materials. Mahinder Yadav is married to Raj Yadav and has three daughters. His wife Raj is self-employed. He is a resident of Hastsal Village in Uttam Nagar area of New Delhi.

Politics
Mahinder Yadav was previously with the Bharatiya Janata Party (BJP). He was a councillor from Ward No. 124 of the Municipal Corporation of Delhi (MCD) from April, 2012 to December, 2013. He was Chairman of Khel Kud & Protsahan Committee in the South Delhi Municipal Corporation (S.D.M.C.) between 2012 and 2013.

In 2012, Yadav switched to the Aam Aadmi Party (AAP). Yadav contested Vikaspuri assembly constituency on an AAP ticket in the December 2013 Delhi Legislative Assembly elections. He polled 62,032 votes and defeated his nearest rival Krishan Gahlot of the BJP by 405 votes. This was the second lowest victory margin in the elections. He also defeated sitting MLA Nand Kishore from the Indian National Congress (INC), who came in third in the contest. He was thus member of the Fifth Legislative Assembly of Delhi between December 2013 and January 2015.

Yadav won the Vikaspuri constituency in the 2015 Delhi Legislative Assembly elections too. He secured 1,32,437 votes, defeating his nearest rival Sanjay Singh of the BJP by the margin of 77,665 votes. This was the highest margin of victory in the elections.

Electoral performance

References 
 

Aam Aadmi Party politicians from Delhi
Living people
Delhi MLAs 2013–2015
Delhi MLAs 2015–2020
Delhi MLAs 2020–2025
1963 births